Hirotoshi Ishii (石井 弘寿, born September 14, 1977) is a Japanese baseball player. He currently plays as a relief pitcher for the Tokyo Yakult Swallows.

He has repeatedly expressed a desire to play in the majors, and several teams have shown an interest in the left-hander. The Swallows were reluctant to release Ishii in the 2005 off-season, but promised they would allow him to come to the majors if he was able to play another full season in Japan (a similar promise was made to Akinori Iwamura, who signed with the Tampa Bay Devil Rays). Ishii was expected to sign with a major league team during the 2006 off-season, but injured his left shoulder, and decided to remain with the Swallows.

He joined the Japanese national baseball team for the 2004 Summer Olympics, and won a bronze medal.

External links
 Career statistics

1977 births
Living people
People from Ichihara, Chiba
Baseball people from Chiba Prefecture
Nippon Professional Baseball pitchers
Yakult Swallows players
Tokyo Yakult Swallows players
Baseball players at the 2004 Summer Olympics
Olympic baseball players of Japan
Olympic bronze medalists for Japan
Olympic medalists in baseball
Medalists at the 2004 Summer Olympics
2006 World Baseball Classic players
Japanese baseball coaches
Nippon Professional Baseball coaches